Jefferson House may refer to:

in Sri Lanka
Jefferson House, Columbo

in the United States
Monticello, Charlottesville, Virginia, home of president Thomas Jefferson
Joe Jefferson Clubhouse, Saddle River, New Jersey, listed on the National Register of Historic Places (NRHP)
Joseph Jefferson House, Jefferson Island, Louisiana, NRHP-listed
W. E. Jefferson House, Boise, Idaho, NRHP-listed in Ada County
John P. Jefferson House, Warren, Pennsylvania, NRHP-listed

See also
Jefferson Hall (disambiguation)
Jefferson School (disambiguation)